New Ralang Monastery or Ralong Palchen Choling is a Buddhist monastery of the Kagyu sect of Tibetan Buddhism in southern Sikkim, northeastern India. It is located six kilometres from Ravangla. Ralang Monastery has an extensive collection of paintings and thangkas.

Construction 
The old monastery underwent reconstruction in 1975-1981 and in 1995, this new monastery, known as Palchen Choeling Monastic Institute was built by the 12th Gyaltsab Rinpoche, which retained its Tibetan architecture. The older Ralang Gompa or Karma Rabtenling monastery is located close west of this new monastery.

Festival 
Ralang Monastery is host to an annual festival, known as Pang Lhabsol when Mount Kangchenjunga is worshipped usually in September and ending in early December with the Kagyed.

See also 
 Tashiding Monastery

References

External links 

Buddhist monasteries in Sikkim
Karma Kagyu monasteries and temples